Ngumpan is a small Aboriginal community, located 95 km south east of Fitzroy Crossing in the Kimberley region of Western Australia, within the Shire of Halls Creek.

Native title 

The community is located within the registered Kurungal (WAD6217/98) native title claim area.

Governance 

The community is managed through its incorporated body, Ngumpan Aboriginal Corporation, incorporated under the Aboriginal Councils and Associations Act 1976 on 1 July 1981.

Town planning 

Ngumpan Layout Plan No.1 has been prepared in accordance with State Planning Policy 3.2 Aboriginal Settlements. Layout Plan No.1 was endorsed by the community on 26 July 2002 and the Western Australian Planning Commission on 4 May 2004. The Layout Plan map-set can be viewed at Planning Western Australia's website.

References

External links 
 Office of the Registrar of Indigenous Corporations
 Native Title Claimant application summary

Towns in Western Australia
Aboriginal communities in Kimberley (Western Australia)